Ellinor Ljungros (born 19 May 1953) is a former female long-distance runner from Sweden, who won the Rotterdam Marathon on 19 April 1986 clocking 2:41:06.

Achievements
All results regarding marathon, unless stated otherwise

References

1953 births
Living people
Swedish female long-distance runners
Swedish female marathon runners